Hibbertia humifusa is a species of flowering plant in the family Dilleniaceae and is endemic to central Victoria, Australia. It is a prostrate to low-lying shrub with linear to elliptic leaves, and bright yellow flowers with six to ten stamens arranged in a cluster on one side of the two carpels.

Description 
There are six to ten stamens arranged in a single cluster on one side of the two carpels.

Taxonomy 
Hibbertia humifusa was first formally described in 1862 by Ferdinand von Mueller in his book The Plants Indigenous to the Colony of Victoria from specimens collected "in barren scrubby plains near Mount Zero". The specific epithet (humifusa) means "low-lying".

In 1995, Hellmut R. Toelken described three subspecies in the Journal of the Adelaide Botanic Gardens and the names are accepted by the Australian Plant Census:

Distribution and habitat 
Subspecies debilis is only known from near Dergholm where it grows in wet heathland and subspecies erigens from the Euroa-Mansfield area where it grows in woodland. The autonym (humifusa) grows in dryish woodland in scattered locations around central Victoria, including in the Grampians and near Stawell.

Conservation status 
Subspecies debilis and erigens are listed as "vulnerable" under the Australian Government Environment Protection and Biodiversity Conservation Act 1999 and the Victorian Government Flora and Fauna Guarantee Act 1988. A national recovery plan has been prepared for subspecies erigens.

See also 
 List of Hibbertia species

References 

humifusa
Flora of Victoria (Australia)
Plants described in 1862
Taxa named by Ferdinand von Mueller